Juan Marcelo Falchi Berta (born 5 January 1991) is a Uruguayan footballer who most recently played as a goalkeeper for Rampla Juniors in the Uruguayan Primera División.

References

External links

1991 births
Living people
Boston River players
C.A. Rentistas players
Miramar Misiones players
Uruguayan Segunda División players
Uruguayan footballers
Association football goalkeepers